Orizabus is a genus of rhinoceros beetles in the family Scarabaeidae. There are about 10 described species in the genus Orizabus.

Species
 Orizabus batesi Prell, 1914
 Orizabus brevicollis Prell, 1914
 Orizabus clunalis (LeConte, 1856)
 Orizabus isodonoides Fairmaire, 1878
 Orizabus ligyroides Horn, 1885
 Orizabus mcclevei Warner, 2011
 Orizabus pinalicus Warner, 2011
 Orizabus pyriformis (LeConte, 1847)
 Orizabus ratcliffei Delgado, 2008
 Orizabus rubricollis Prell, 1914

References

Further reading

 
 
 

Dynastinae